is a subway station on the Osaka Metro Midosuji Line in Abeno-ku, Osaka, Japan.

Layout
There are two side platforms with two tracks underground.

Surroundings
Sharp Corporation Headquarters
Nagaike Park
Nagai Stadium (North)
 Tsurugaoka Station

Abeno-ku, Osaka
Osaka Metro stations
Railway stations in Japan opened in 1952